This is a listing of the horses that finished in either first, second, or third place and the number of starters in the Davona Dale Stakes, an American Grade 2 race for three-year-old fillies at 1⅛ miles (9 furlongs) on dirt held at Gulfstream Park in
Hallandale Beach, Florida.  (List 1988-present)

A # indicates that the race was run in two divisions in 1988.

References 

Gulfstream Park
Lists of horse racing results